The PFL 4 mixed martial arts event for the 2022 season of the Professional Fighters League was held on June 17, 2022 at the Overtime Elite Arena in Atlanta, Georgia. This marked the fourth regular season event of the tournament and included fights in the Lightweight and Light Heavyweight divisions.

Background 
The event was headlined by a lightweight clash between Clay Collard and Alexander Martinez, while defending light heavyweight champion Antônio Carlos Júnior faces off against Bruce Souto in the co-main event. The remaining two fights off the main card include 2021 champion Raush Manfio taking on former UFC veteran Olivier Aubin-Mercier, while long-time UFC veteran Jeremy Stephens takes on Myles Price.

Results

Standings After Event 
The PFL points system is based on results of the match.  The winner of a fight receives 3 points.  If the fight ends in a draw, both fighters will receive 1 point. The bonus for winning a fight in the first, second, or third round is 3 points, 2 points, and 1 point respectively. The bonus for winning in the third round requires a fight be stopped before 4:59 of the third round.  No bonus point will be awarded if a fighter wins via decision.  For example, if a fighter wins a fight in the first round, then the fighter will receive 6 total points. A decision win will result in three total points.  If a fighter misses weight, the opponent (should they comply with weight limits) will receive 3 points due to a walkover victory, regardless of winning or losing the bout;  if the non-offending fighter subsequently wins with a stoppage, all bonus points will be awarded.

Light Heavyweight

Lightweight

Reported payout 
The following is the reported payout to the fighters as reported to the Georgia Athletic Commission. It is important to note the amounts do not include sponsor money, discretionary bonuses, viewership points or additional earnings.

 Alex Martinez: $38,000 ($19,000 show + $19,000 win) def. Clay Collard: $28,000
 Antonio Carlos Junior: $98,000 ($49,000 show + $49,000 win) def.  Bruce Souto: $10,000
 Olivier Aubin-Mercier: $54,000 ($27,000 show + $27,000 win) def. Raush Manfio: $27,000
 Jeremy Stephens: $200,000 ($100,000 show + $100,000 win) def. Myles Price: $12,000
 Omari Akhmedov: $206,000 ($103,000 show + $103,000 win) def. Teodoras Aukstuolis: $15,000
 Nathan Schulte: $150,000 ($75,000 show + $75,000 win) def. Marcin Held: $26,000
 Delan Kimura: $20,000 ($10,000 show + $10,000 win) def. Emiliano Sordi: $53,000
 Rob Wilkinson: $32,000 ($16,000 show + $16,000 win) def. Viktor Pesta: $18,000
 Josh Silveira: $50,000 ($25,000 show + $25,000 win) def. Marthin Hamlet: $16,000
 Nate Jennerman: $16,000 ($8,000 show + $8,000 win) def. Jacob Childers: $8,000

See also 

 List of PFL events
 List of current PFL fighters

References 

Events in Atlanta
Professional Fighters League
2022 in mixed martial arts
June 2022 sports events in the United States